The 2022 Central Michigan Chippewas baseball team represents Central Michigan University during the 2022 NCAA Division I baseball season. The Chippewas play their home games at Bill Theunissen Stadium as a member of the Mid-American Conference They are led by head coach Jordan Bischel, in his fourth year as manager.

Personnel

Roster

Preseason

MAC Coaches poll

The MAC coaches poll was released on February 15, 2022 with Central Michigan predicted to finish first in the Mid-American Conference, receiving six out of eleven first place votes. Despite being picked to finish third Kent State received two first place votes, while Ball State, Toledo, and Miami each received one of the three remaining first place votes. The Chippewas were also slated to win the 2022 MAC tournament garnering four of the eleven votes. The other vote-getters were 12 time conference tournament champion Kent State with three votes, one time champion Ball State with two, and respective three and zero time champions Miami and Toledo each receiving one of the remaining two.

Schedule and results 

Schedule Notes

Postseason

MAC tournament

NCAA tournament

Gainesville Regional

References

External links 
 Central Michigan Baseball

Central Michigan Chippewas baseball seasons
Central Michigan Chippewas
Central Michigan Chippewas
Central